McCredie Springs are hot springs and a former resort in Lane County, Oregon, United States. It is known for the nearby natural hot springs along Salt Creek.

History
Frank Warner, a trapper, came upon a series of hot springs along Salt Creek and settled near them in 1878. He lived in the cabin he built there until he was evicted by the newly formed United States Forest Service (USFS) in the early 1900s. In 1911, John Hardin filed a mineral claim on the land, ostensibly because of the salt found there, but he actually wanted to build a resort on the land leased from the USFS. He named the place Winino Springs and opened a hotel in 1914. Judge William Wallace McCredie bought an interest in the springs resort in 1916, and established a training quarters for his Portland baseball club, the Portland Beavers.

A post office named Winino was established near Salt Creek on July 8, 1924. The compiler of Oregon Geographic Names believed the name was of Native American origin, but could not find a definition. The office was closed during the time the Southern Pacific Railroad (now Union Pacific) Cascade Line was being built, on December 31, 1925, with mail going to Railhead. The resort came be known as McCredie Springs. McCredie Springs post office operated intermittently from September 14, 1926, until October 2, 1953.
 
During its heyday in the 1930s, the resort was served by five Southern Pacific passenger trains each day. In 1940, the resort community had a population of 19, cabins, a hotel, and a store.

The hotel burned to the ground in 1958 and the Christmas flood of 1964 destroyed the bridge that provided access to the springs. The Forest Service cancelled the lease and razed the remaining buildings. Today, the site remains mostly natural.

Hot springs

Water profile
The mineral content includes: sodium, potassium, calcium, magnesium, iron, aluminum, silicon dioxide, boron, lithium, bicarbonate, sulfate, chlorine, fluorine.

Further reading

References

External links
Historic Images of McCredie Springs from the University of Oregon Libraries
Historic images of McCredie Springs from the Lane County Historical Society

Hot springs of Oregon
Portland Beavers
Spa towns in Oregon
Unincorporated communities in Lane County, Oregon
Unincorporated communities in Oregon